Eucomis comosa, the pineapple flower, pineapple lily or wine eucomis, is a species of flowering plant in the asparagus family Asparagaceae (subfamily Scilloideae). A deciduous bulbous perennial used as an ornamental plant, it is endemic to South Africa. The white to purple flowers appear in summer and are arranged in a spike (raceme), topped by a "head" of green leaflike bracts.

Description
Eucomis comosa is a perennial plant, growing from a large bulb, which is often purple in colour. The leaves usually have purple spots and may have an overall purple tinge; var. striata has purple stripes. The tepals are whitish to purple, the ovary always purple. Most plants have a pleasant coconut-like scent. The inflorescence is topped by a head (coma) of bracts, often purple spotted or tinged like the leaves. The overall effect is of a miniature pineapple plant (Ananas comosus), though in fact the two species are not closely related.

Taxonomy
The species was first described by Maarten Houttuyn in 1780, as Asphodelus comosus. The specific epithet comosus (shared by the pineapple, Ananas comosus) means "tufted". In 1929,  transferred the species to Eucomis. It is one of a group of larger tetraploid species of Eucomis, with 2n = 4x = 60.

Distribution and habitat
Eucomis comosa is native to the east Cape Provinces and the province of KwaZulu-Natal in South Africa.

Cultivation
Eucomis comosa is an ornamental plant with numerous cultivars, varying in colour from forms with white flowers and little or no purple on the leaves, to forms with deeply coloured leaves. In the UK, the cultivar 'Sparkling Burgundy', with reddish purple leaves, has gained the Royal Horticultural Society's Award of Garden Merit.

Gallery

References

External links

Eucomis comosa

Scilloideae
Flora of the Cape Provinces
Flora of KwaZulu-Natal
Plants described in 1780